Blue hole refers to a frequented swimming hole just past Rawley Springs, Virginia situated in the Dry River. The boundaries of the George Washington National Forest surround the swimming hole.

History

The Rawley Springs area has a history of European settlers and their descendants, mostly men, purchasing and building vacation stays and fine boarding houses in the area. A series of fires in the 1800s brought these buildings down. Today there is a cluster of homes making up the Rawley Springs area. Commercialization of the area, like building hotels and resorts, is no longer allowed.

The springs, which feed into the Dry River are said to be a place of healing.

Use

The swimming hole has not been developed with a parking area and easy access, although for some this is also the allure. Most people park on the shoulder of Route 33 just past Rawley Springs heading west. A short but steep climb down to the river follows. The path's location is unmarked but worn enough to be noticeable.

Note: This article refers to Blue Hole adjacent to US Route 33.  There is a second Blue Hole swimming area near Bergton, VA.

References

Rockingham County, Virginia